Kamna Gora is a settlement in the Municipality of Slovenske Konjice in eastern Slovenia. It lies on the southern slopes of Mount Konjice. The area is part of the traditional region of Styria and is now included in the Savinja Statistical Region.

Mass grave
Kamna Gora is the site of a mass grave associated with the Second World War. The Kamna Gora Mass Grave is located north of the settlement, on the slope of Mount Konjice. It contains the remains of 14 Slovenes that were mobilized into the German army.

References

External links
Kamna Gora at Geopedia

Populated places in the Municipality of Slovenske Konjice